Yannis Yfantis is a Greek poet who is awarded with the Cavafy Award.  He was born in 1949 in Raina near Agrinio in Aetolia-Acarnania.  He was presented to the Thessaloniki Public Broadcasting with Elliniki kai pagkosmia poiisi (Ελληνική και παγκόσμια ποίηση = Greek And International Poetry) and Kata vathos to thema ine ena (Κατά βάθος το θέμα είναι ένα).  His poems were translated into several languages including English.

Poetry

Mystiki tis Anatolis (Μυστικοί της Ανατολής = Secrets From The East) (1980)
Ancient Edda (1983)
O Kathreftis tou Protea (Ο Καθρέφτης του Πρωτέα = The Mirror of Protea) (1986])
Naos tou Kosmou (Ναός του Κόσμου = The Temple Of The World) (1996)
O Kipos tis Poiisis (Ο Κήπος της Ποίησης = The Garden Of Poetry) (2000)
Arhetypa (Αρχέτυπα = Archetype) (2001)

References

''The first version of the article is translated from the article at the Greek Wikipedia (Main page)

External links
Homepage of Yannis Yfantis 
Poems by Yannis Yfantis from Translatum's anthology of Poets from Thessaloniki 

Modern Greek poets
1949 births
Living people
20th-century Greek poets
Date of birth missing (living people)
20th-century Greek male writers
21st-century Greek poets
21st-century Greek male writers
People from Agrinio